Mitra Bir was a freedom fighter and educationist from Goa, who was sentenced to twelve years in jail at the age of 22 when the region was a Portuguese colony. She later opened schools for girls at Margao, Verem, Kakora and other locations in Goa, as well as centres for adult and vocational education for women. She was married to the late Madhav R. Bir, a former member of the Goa assembly and Gandhian.

She died in 1978.

References

1978 deaths
Women educators from Goa
Goa liberation activists
Year of birth missing
Women Indian independence activists
20th-century Indian women politicians
Indian human rights activists
Educators from Goa
20th-century Indian politicians
Indian women educational theorists
20th-century Indian educational theorists
20th-century women educators